Pomeroy is a city in Garfield County, Washington, United States. The population was 1,425 at the 2010 census. It is the county seat of and only incorporated city in Garfield County.

Geography
Pomeroy is located at  (46.473334, -117.598119).

U.S. Route 12 in Washington serves as the primary highway through town, connecting Pomeroy with the Lewiston–Clarkston metropolitan area (to the east) and the Tri-Cities metro area/Walla Walla area (to the west).  The city is 1,857 ft above sea level in the very hilly region between the Blue Mountains (to the south) and the Palouse region (to the north).  The primary highway through town passes over Alpowa Summit (2,785 ft) only a few miles east of town.

History
The Nez Perce trail existed in the area before history was recorded, and the first written record of caucasians passing through the area were Lewis and Clark in 1805. Captain Benjamin Bonneville also passed through the future site of the town while he was surveying for the US government in 1834.  In 1860, an Irish settler named Parson Quinn settled just east of present-day Pomeroy, and lived there for the next 40 years. Rancher Joseph M. Pomeroy purchased the land in 1864, and platted the town's site in May 1878.

Pomeroy was officially incorporated on February 3, 1886. The town has been the seat of Garfield County since 1882, despite fierce competition in the 1880s with neighboring towns Pataha and Asotin.  The county was split in October 1883, and the city of Asotin was named the county seat of the new Asotin County, Washington, leaving the debate about Pomeroy's status as county seat for Garfield County to continue. The debate continued through both houses of the Washington Territorial Legislature in for the remainder of 1883 to Governor William A. Newell of the Washington Territory, and eventually reached the United States Congress in 1884.

On July 18, 1900 (despite a city ordinance which mandated fire-proof materials for downtown buildings; there had been fires in 1890 and 1898 as well) fire destroyed half of the small town's business district. The recovery took two years as the destroyed buildings were rebuilt using brick - a building boom for the small community.  In 1912, the City voted to outlaw the manufacture or sale of alcohol. This prohibition quickly led to rampant bootlegging and corruption which lasted until the 21st Amendment passed in 1933.

On August 21, 2003, following efforts by the Pomeroy Historic Committee, a 10-block section of Pomeroy's downtown was placed on the National Historic Register.

Demographics

2010 census
As of the census of 2010, there were 1,425 people, 642 households, and 401 families residing in the city. The racial makeup of the city was 94.9% White, 0.3% Native American, 1.3% Asian, 1.3% from other races, and 2.2% from two or more races. Hispanic or Latino of any race were 3.2% of the population.

There were 642 households, of which 25.1% had children under the age of 18 living with them, 50.8% were married couples living together, 7.5% had a female householder with no husband present, 4.2% had a male householder with no wife present, and 37.5% were non-families. 34.0% of all households were made up of individuals, and 19.4% had someone living alone who was 65 years of age or older. The average household size was 2.16 and the average family size was 2.74.

The median age in the city was 50 years. 19.6% of residents were under the age of 18; 5.1% were between the ages of 18 and 24; 18.6% were from 25 to 44; 32.5% were from 45 to 64; and 24.4% were 65 years of age or older. The gender makeup of the city was 47.5% male and 52.5% female.

2000 census
As of the census of 2000, there were 1,517 people, 645 households, and 408 families residing in the city. The population density was 852.2 people per square mile (329.1/km2). There were 740 housing units at an average density of 415.7 per square mile (160.5/km2). The racial makeup of the city was 96.37% White, 0.53% Native American, 0.40% Asian, 0.07% Pacific Islander, 1.52% from other races, and 1.12% from two or more races. Hispanic or Latino of any race were 2.24% of the population.

There were 645 households, out of which 25.3% had children under the age of 18 living with them, 51.0% were married couples living together, 7.3% had a female householder with no husband present, and 36.7% were non-families. 33.0% of all households were made up of individuals, and 18.1% had someone living alone who was 65 years of age or older. The average household size was 2.29 and the average family size was 2.92.

In the city, the age distribution of the population shows 25.5% under the age of 18, 5.6% from 18 to 24, 20.1% from 25 to 44, 23.5% from 45 to 64, and 25.2% who were 65 years of age or older. The median age was 44 years. For every 100 females, there were 91.1 males. For every 100 females age 18 and over, there were 84.9 males.

The median income for a household in the city was $28,958, and the median income for a family was $38,750. Males had a median income of $32,500 versus $21,118 for females. The per capita income for the city was $15,782. About 11.7% of families and 15.1% of the population were below the poverty line, including 22.9% of those under age 18 and 9.5% of those age 65 or over.

Climate
Pomeroy, as is typical for this region, has a borderline Mediterranean/continental Mediterranean climate (Köppen Csb/Dsb) with dry summers featuring warm to hot afternoons and cool to warm mornings, and chilly, cool, or cold and snowy, if not severe, and wetter winters.

Education

Students in Pomeroy are part of Pomeroy School District 110 and complete their secondary public school education at Pomeroy Junior/Senior High School.

Notable people
 Samuel G. Cosgrove (1847–1909), 6th governor of Washington
 Mary Dye - Politician. Member of Washington House of Representatives. 
 Elgin V. Kuykendall (1870–1958), attorney, judge, and member of the Washington State Senate
 Michael P. Malone (1940–1999), historian and president of Montana State University

Events
The following events are organized annually by the Pomeroy Chamber of Commerce: 
 Pioneer Day and Tumbleweed Festival: second weekend in June
 Garfield County Fair: September 16–19
 Starlight Parade and Festival of Trees: Friday after Thanksgiving

References

External links
 History of Pomeroy at HistoryLink
 Garfield County Heritage. Digitized resources from the Denny Ashby Library, Eastern Washington Agricultural Museum, and Garfield County Museum.
 A website for the Historic Preservation Committee
 A website with historical information
 Denny Ashby Library (Public library, Pomeroy, WA).
 A website with current information

Cities in Garfield County, Washington
Cities in Washington (state)
County seats in Washington (state)
1886 establishments in Washington Territory
Populated places established in 1886